Robbie Dynamite (born Robert Berzins) is a British professional wrestler. He is the current and five-time British Mid-Heavyweight champion and has also held the British Open Tag Team Championship and Unified British Tag Team Championship with Mikey Whiplash.  He had a one day reign with the British Heavyweight Championship in August 2016.

Professional wrestling career

British Wrestling
Dynamite began his career with Staffordshire promotion GBH, later being headhunted by All Star Wrestling in 2001 along with fellow GBH alumnus Dean Allmark.  Initially, he was a blue eye teamed with Allmark, but soon turned heel on him, igniting a feud that would run throughout the 2000s.  As a heel, Dynamite adopted the moniker "The Body" (previously made famous by American wrestler turned commentator turned politician Jesse Ventura.)

In April 2002, Dynamite defeated Allmark to capture the vacant British Mid-Heavyweight title, thus reviving the historic championship left vacant for the past 21 years since the death of previous champion Mike Marino in 1981. Over the course of the remainder of the decade, he would lose and regain the championship four times, mostly to Allmark.  He also formed a tag team with "Chippendale" Mikey Whiplash and together, they captured the British Open Tag Team Title from the UK Dream Team of Allmark and Kid Cool in February 2006 in Staffordshire.

In 2013, Dynamite challenged Mikey Whiplash for the ICW Heavyweight Championship but was defeated.

At Wrestling Festival 2015, Dynamite defeated Minoru Tanaka for the EWP Intercontinental Championship.

At a house show in Rhyl on 30 August 2016, Dynamite defeated James Mason to win the British Heavyweight Championship (left vacant after Sam Adonis was stripped of the title for lack of defences) but lost the belt later in the night to Allmark, who had earned the championship match in a Money In The Bank match earlier in the evening.

Total Nonstop Action Wrestling
Robbie Dynamite was a member of Team Britain in TNA Wrestling's 2004 America's X-Cup. Team Britain was led by James Mason, mentored by David Taylor, and also included Dean Allmark and Frankie Sloan. Team Britain finished in last place in America's X-Cup behind Team Mexico, Team USA, and Team Canada. The Tournament was virtually dominated by AAA's Team Mexico. After America's X-Cup ended, Team Britain did not return to TNA for the 2004 World X-Cup. The fourth Team spot was filled by Team Japan.

Championships and accomplishments
All Star Wrestling
British Heavyweight Championship (1 time)
British Mid-Heavyweight Championship (5 times)
European Wrestling Promotion 
EWP Intercontinental Championship (1 time)
International Pro Wrestling: United Kingdom 
IPW:UK Tag Team Championship (1 time)
Revolution Pro Wrestling
Undisputed British Tag Team Championship (1 time) – with Mikey Whiplash

References

External links
TNAWrestling.com (Official Website of TNA Wrestling)

1982 births
English male professional wrestlers
Living people
Sportspeople from Stoke-on-Trent
Undisputed British Tag Team Champions